Kamil Rosiek (born 6 April 1984) is a biathlete and cross-country skier who has represented Poland at several Winter Paralympic Games. He served as their flag-bearer at the 2018 Winter Paralympics Parade of Nations.

References 

Paralympic biathletes of Poland
Paralympic cross-country skiers of Poland
Biathletes at the 2010 Winter Paralympics
Biathletes at the 2014 Winter Paralympics
Biathletes at the 2018 Winter Paralympics
Cross-country skiers at the 2006 Winter Paralympics
Cross-country skiers at the 2010 Winter Paralympics
Cross-country skiers at the 2014 Winter Paralympics
Cross-country skiers at the 2018 Winter Paralympics
1984 births
Living people